Pasquale Scimeca is an Italian film director and producer.

Filmography
 Il giorno di San Sebastiano (Saint Sebastian's Day) (1993)
 Placido Rizzotto (2000)
 Gli indesiderabili (2003)
 Il cavaliere sole (2008)
 Malavoglia (2010)

External links

1956 births
Living people
Italian film directors